Catherine David (born 1954) is a French art historian, curator and museum director.  David was the first woman and the first non-German speaker to curate documenta X in Kassel, Germany (21 June – 28 September 1997).   David is currently deputy director of the National Museum of Modern Art (Musée National d'Art Moderne) at the Centre Georges Pompidou.  She was born and lives in Paris.

Education and work
David studied Spanish and Portuguese literature, linguistics and art history at the Université de la Sorbonne and the École du Louvre in Paris. From 1981 to 1990 she was a curator at the National Museum of Modern Art (Musée National d'Art Moderne), Centre Pompidou, Paris.   From 1990 to 1994 she moved to the National Gallery of the Jeu de Paume (Galerie Nationale du Jeu de Paume), also in Paris, where she organized several solo and group exhibitions including: "Reinhard Mucha, Passages de l'image"; "Stan Douglas: Monodramas and Television Spots"; "Marcel Broodthaers"; "Hélio Oiticica"; "Eva Hesse"; "Jeff Wall and Chantal Ackerman: D'Est", among others. In the 1990s, she took part to a worldwide movement with Okwui Enwezor, judging art according to natural disasters, migration policies and gender war.

In 1994 David was appointed artistic director of documenta X in Kassel, staged in the summer of 1997.  She made headlines in the international art world with her original approach to documenta, where she brought her cross-sector discipline to the exhibition, inviting writers, sociologists and architects, as well as artists, to speak over the 100-day exhibition. For the first time a website was conceived as a part of the exhibition, curate by the artist and Swiss curator Simon Lamunière. Documenta X still is one of the most relevant major exhibitions of the 20th Century, a place where the ideas of Center and Periphery, Modern and Pre-Modern could be examined and understood. Catherine David lead the way to show what "political art" means, and inspired the programme of a good number of museums around Europe in the early 21st Century. 

In 1999 she went on to curate the film and video program of the XXIV Biennial of São Paulo. The following year she organized "The State of Things" for the KW Institute for Contemporary Art, Berlin.  In 2002 she took over as Director of the Witte de With Center for Contemporary Art in Rotterdam where she remained until 2004.  Over several years David was chief curator of the Musées de France (French Museum Board).  She was also artistic director of the 2009 Lyon Biennale.

Turning her focus to the Middle East, David became Director of the long-term project "Contemporary Arab Representations" (Représentations Arabes Contemporaines ) in 1998, an initiative presenting contemporary Middle East and Arab artists, first shown at the Fundació Antoni Tàpies in Barcelona.  In 2006, she staged the exhibition "The Iraqi Equation" in Berlin and Barcelona.  In December 2007, she curated "DI / VISIONS. Culture and politics in the Middle East" at the Haus der Kulturen der Welt in Berlin, which aimed to break down the Western stereotype of Arab culture. In 2009 she organized a retrospective in honor of the Iranian photographer Bahman Jalali, again at the Fundació Antoni Tàpies, Barcelona and was artistic director of the first national presentation of the ADACH (Abu Dhabi Authority for Culture and Heritage) at the Venice Biennale.  In March 2011 she organized Hassan Sharif's exhibition "Experiments & Objects 1979-2011" at the ADACH Exhibition hall in Abu Dhabi and launched the first monographic publication of the artist in Venice Biennale 2011.

In 2014 David curated "UNEDITED HISTORY, Iran 1960-2014" at the Musée d'Art Moderne de la Ville de Paris. Earlier in the year it was announced that David would be returning to Centre Pompidou with her appointment as the deputy director and head of global outreach for the National Museum of Modern Art (Musée National d'Art Moderne), replacing Catherine Grenier.

Catherine David was a member of the advisory committee of MACBA in Barcelona during the tenure of Ferran Barenblit as director (2015-2021). She is member of the advisory committee of the Saradar Collection, devoted to Lebanese art from the contemporary and modern periods, and of NTU Centre for Contemporary Art Singapore directed by Ute Meta Bauer.

References

External links

1954 births
Living people
French art historians
French art curators
Directors of museums in France
University of Paris alumni
École du Louvre alumni
Curators from Paris
Women art historians
Women museum directors
French women historians
French women curators